Apollonia Hirscher (died 1547), was a Transylvanian Saxon merchant of what is now Brașov in Romania, part of the Eastern Hungarian Kingdom during her lifetime.  She inherited and managed a merchant empire from her late spouse, mayor Lukas Hirscher III (d. 1541), and traded with Austria and the Ottoman Empire. She was the builder of the Brașov House of Merchants.

References

16th-century births
1547 deaths
Transylvanian Saxon people
16th-century businesspeople
16th-century businesswomen
People from Brașov
16th-century Hungarian women
16th-century Hungarian people
16th-century merchants